The Hyde House is a historic house located at 27 George Street in Newton, Massachusetts.

Description and history 
It is a -story Greek Revival house, with a sidehall plan and a columned porch that wraps around two sides of the house. The oldest portion of the house is believed to date to 1709, when an even older structure burned and was immediately rebuilt (suggesting that the house may have even older timbers). The house was thereafter added to numerous times, and was moved from its original location on Centre Street to this location in 1909. The area where it stands was held in the Hyde family for eight generations, until George Hyde sold the remaining farmlands for development in the late 19th century.

The house was listed on the National Register of Historic Places September 4, 1986.

See also
 Hyde Avenue Historic District, built on lands George Hyde sold off
 National Register of Historic Places listings in Newton, Massachusetts

References

Houses on the National Register of Historic Places in Newton, Massachusetts
Houses completed in 1709
Greek Revival architecture in Massachusetts